Colaspis planicostata is a species of leaf beetle from North America. It is distributed in southern Texas and in Mexico.

References

Further reading

 

Eumolpinae
Articles created by Qbugbot
Taxa named by Doris Holmes Blake
Beetles described in 1974
Beetles of North America